France-Empire is an independent French publishing house, created in 1945 by .

History 
In 1945, from the end of the Second World War, the Éditions France-Empire began their activity by publishing works concerning the period 1939-1945 then the period of decolonization. The publishing house was created from the funds of the Sève et Morat. In the 1960s and 1970s, France-Empire was influenced notably by the success of the series of  devoted to deportation in the Holocaust, which was by far the biggest seller of editions at that time.

The Éditions France-Empire then pursued this path by including in their catalog essays, novels, biographies and memoirs in the historical domain. The company belongs to the group Desquenne et Giral (euronext) since 1990.

The Éditions France-Empire was deregistered on March 26, 2013.

Some authors 

 Christian Bernadac
 Yann Brekilien
 Jean Deruelle
 Alexandre Dumas
 Jean-Pierre Fourcade
 Guy Gauthier
 André Girard
 Philippe Guilhaume
 Philippe Kieffer
 Stéphanie Le Bail
 Hervé Le Boterf
 Yves Le Prieur
 Pierre Mazeaud
 Colonel Rémy
 Jeanne de Recqueville
 Michel Roussin
 Alice Saunier-Seité
 Henri Spade
 Pierre Suard
 Violaine Vanoyeke
 Pierre Clostermann
 Samuel Dock
 Hafid Aggoune
 Marc Villemain
 Alain Vircondelet
 Jérôme-Arnaud Wagner
 Frédéric Chaslin
 Éric Vanneufville
 Jean Prasteau

References

External links 
 France-Empire on Biblio Monde
 France-Empire on Imec.com
 Jacques-Marie Laffont reprend les éditions France Empire on Livres Hebdo (10 July 2014)
 France Empire on Rue des Livres

Book publishing companies of France
Publishing companies established in 1945
1945 establishments in France